Goodwall is an app that aims to provide young people with opportunities to develop their skills and gain access to educational and work-related opportunities. The platform is designed primarily for the Gen Z demographic and allows members to create a digital profile to showcase their skills and achievements using photos and videos. Users are encouraged to engage in skills-based challenges and online programs that focus on transferable skills such as problem-solving, creativity, and communication. The Goodwall app is available on both iOS and Android.

History 

Goodwall's social networking platform was founded by Omar and Taha Bawa, two brothers from Geneva, Switzerland. The Bawa brothers were raised in a family that had a strong commitment to humanitarian work, with their parents serving the UNHCR and The Global Fund. Growing up, they were exposed to global challenges and were inspired to make a meaningful impact.

The idea for Goodwall stemmed from End Ignorance, a blog created by Omar Bawa in 2012 to bring attention to various global crises. The Bawa brothers expanded the blog into a social network, which was launched as a website in January 2014 and later developed into a mobile-first platform in 2015.

Initially aimed at students from high school to university, Goodwall has since broadened its focus to include entrepreneurs and young professionals. The platform attracts members from diverse socioeconomic backgrounds and countries, with an average age range of 16-26. Currently, Goodwall has more than 2 million members across 150 countries and is headquartered in Geneva, Switzerland.

Services

The Goodwall App 

The Goodwall app provides an alternative to traditional CVs where users can showcase their skills and achievements through photos and videos on a digital profile. Additionally, the app offers online programs and challenges to enhance skills and connect with like-minded individuals globally. Users can communicate through the chat feature and interact with each other’s posts via commenting and upvoting. The platform aims to connect users with opportunities related to education and work such as jobs, internships, courses, scholarships, and volunteer work.

The Goodwall Blog 

Goodwall’s blog was relaunched in late 2019 with an updated design and visuals. The blog focuses on topics of interest to students and young professionals including entrepreneurship, academia, job searching, careers, social impact, climate change, scholarships, motivation, and more.

Partnerships 

Goodwall collaborates with a range of companies, organizations, and governments to develop programs intended to enhance the skills and mobilization of young people. Some of the company's partners include UNICEF, Generation Unlimited, GIZ, Yoma, Randstad NV, and SAP.

In 2022, Goodwall, with the support of Stratline, Converge, and UNESCO's Goodwill Ambassador and First Lady of Cameroon, Mrs. Chantal Biya, delivered an 8-week program with a focus on skill development, entrepreneurial thinking, and environmental awareness. The program aimed to empower the youth of Cameroon by exposing them to various challenges related to entrepreneurship, motivation, sustainability, and gender equality.

In 2023, Goodwall partnered with Nation Media Group (NMG) in East Africa to conduct programs that engage young people on issues such as sustainability, education, health, and the environment.

Emurgo, the official commercial arm and a founding member of the Cardano blockchain, announced its collaboration with Goodwall in February 2023. Emurgo intends to facilitate Goodwall's growth into a Web3 service that utilizes Cardano's environmentally-friendly blockchain to connect young people with the global economy.

Goodwall announced its expansion into Nigeria in 2023, thanks to its partnership with TecBlu, a Nigerian one-stop technology services company.

Milestones 

Goodwall is a company that has expanded its team to more than 60 employees across four continents. It has secured over $16 million in funding and received support from Randstad, a prominent global HR and recruitment company, as well as Manixer, a private equity firm with a focus on education.

In December 2019, the Android version of the Goodwall app achieved 1,000,000 downloads, while in early June 2020, the Goodwall community surpassed 1.5 million members.

Awards and recognition 

Goodwall has received coverage in various media outlets including the Wall Street Journal, Forbes, Inc Magazine, The Next Web, and the University Herald due to its growth and positive mission. 

In September 2019, Venturelab recognized Goodwall as one of Switzerland's best scale-ups. Taha and Omar Bawa, the founders of Goodwall, have been recognized by numerous organizations including the World Economic Forum, the United Nations, Forbes 30 under 30, CNN, TEDx, and Google.

References 

 
 
  

Social networks for social change
Internet properties established in 2014
Swiss websites
Employment social networks
2014 establishments in Switzerland